Albert William Foster (1 November 1884 – 29 May 1959) was an English professional footballer who made 67 appearances in the Football League playing for Lincoln City. He played as an outside right.

Life and career
Foster was born in Sleaford, Lincolnshire. He played football for Grantham Avenue before beginning his professional career with Lincoln City, then playing in the Football League Second Division. He made his debut in December 1906, and played regularly until the 1908–09 season in the Midland League. Thereafter his appearances became infrequent, and his last senior game was in early 1912. He spent two seasons at Central Alliance club Grantham before returning to Lincoln City for the last season before the First World War, though without appearing for the first team.

Foster later worked as a licensed victualler in Sleaford, where he died in 1959.

References

1884 births
1959 deaths
People from Sleaford, Lincolnshire
English footballers
Association football outside forwards
Grantham Avenue F.C. players
Lincoln City F.C. players
Grantham Town F.C. players
English Football League players
Midland Football League players